Little Sycamore is an unincorporated community located in Claiborne County, Tennessee. It is located just south of Tazewell.

It contains Little Sycamore Church.

References

Unincorporated communities in Claiborne County, Tennessee
Unincorporated communities in Tennessee